Night Prayer may refer to:

 Isha prayer, the night-time daily prayer obligatory in Islam
 Compline, a canonical hour prayed by Christians at the end of the day
 Evening Prayer (disambiguation), various meanings